Pseudorhytisma is a genus of fungi within the Cryptomycetaceae family. This is a monotypic genus, containing the single species Pseudorhytisma bistortae.

References

External links
Index Fungorum

Leotiomycetes
Monotypic Leotiomycetes genera